SABC is the South African Broadcasting Corporation, it can also refer to:

 Société Anonyme des Brasseries du Cameroun
 Self Aid Buddy Care Training (SABC), in the United States Air Force military training
 Shrewsbury and Atcham Borough Council, in the United Kingdom
 South Asian Bible College